Ravenscraig is a village and new town, located in North Lanarkshire, Scotland, around 1½  miles east of Motherwell. Ravenscraig was formerly the site of Ravenscraig steelworks; once the largest hot strip steel mill in western Europe, the steelworks closed in 1992, and is now almost totally demolished.

After over two decades of lying derelict, the empty land was redeveloped in the 2010s, with new houses and services being built on a large scale. The main contributors to this project were Wilson Bowden Developments Ltd, Scottish Enterprise and Tata Steel Europe.

Location
Located in North Lanarkshire, Ravenscraig lies between the towns of Wishaw and Motherwell and the villages of Carfin and Newarthill, an area with a combined population of over 120,000.

Ravenscraig is only some ten minutes drive from both the M74 and the M8 motorways, which lead to Glasgow and Edinburgh – Scotland's two largest cities – respectively.

A rail line travels directly through the site and another travels around the opposite end of the site.

History

Ravenscraig Steel Works, as well as the former settlement of the same title, took its name from the nearby secluded cliff face called Ravenscraig. This translates as Raven's Cliff or Cliff of the Ravens. It is situated in the valley of the North Calder Water, north of the steelworks site. This is first shown on the 1st Edition Ordnance Survey Map of 1859.

A major expansion of Colvilles, the largest steel manufacturer in the United Kingdom before World War II, was approved in July 1954 by the Iron and Steel Board.

In 1954 the first stages of development began in Ravenscraig, turning a green field into a site for steelworks. By 1957 several coke ovens, a by-products plant, a blast furnace and an open hearth melting shop with three steelmaking furnaces were built, and by 1959 a stripmill was complete.

The closure of Ravenscraig in 1992 signalled the end of large-scale steel making in Scotland, and was the cause of a loss of 770 jobs, with another 10,000 job losses directly and indirectly linked to the closure.

Current state

Over the course of several years, separate new build estates were constructed across the old sites, connected by a central road network that runs through to Carfin. The massive sports facility was one of the first buildings to be constructed and one of the largest of its kind in Scotland, catering to a number of different sports. Plans are also underway to stop the decontamination of the South Calder Water in the area, which suffered from the industrial activity and toxic chemicals. There are also plantations designed to encourage diversity in the site wildlife, including reforestation of local woodland.

As of 2021, there exists thousands of newly built homes and several pubs in the area, however the project is not fully completed.

Regeneration

After many years of planning, Ravenscraig was to be 'regenerated' and rebuilt by three equal shareholders: Wilson Bowden Developments Ltd, Scottish Enterprise and Tata Steel. The project was one of the largest regenerations in Europe, with  being developed.

Ravenscraig would be home to several new facilities:

Part of the development was to create new habitats for the wildlife already living in the area, such as deer, foxes, hares, otters, badgers, watervoles, butterflies and birds such as the wader, song thrush and the little ringed plover, with an Ecological Clerk of Works appointed to 'ensure compliance with Ravenscraig Ltd.’s aims and objectives by all developers and contractors.'

The new £29 million sports complex (completed October 2010) was used as training camps for the 2012 London Olympics in London and the 2014 Commonwealth Games in Glasgow. The complex was also the host facility for the 2011 International Children's Games.

Debates

The plans for the regeneration generated a certain amount of controversy; local residents and businesses were worried about the proposed shopping facilities. It is feared that new shopping facilities in the town centre will destroy jobs and nearby businesses and town centres (e.g. Motherwell and Wishaw) will suffer. Nearby shopping centres such as Motherwell Shopping Centre, the Regent Shopping Centre in Hamilton and East Kilbride Shopping Centre have complained that new shopping facilities may take away their regular customers, a statement that North Lanarkshire Council leader Jim McCabe disputes.

Ravenscraig today

The first major development, the new Motherwell College, was the first to be completed. The building aimed to attract in excess of 20,000 students. The new regional sports facility was also completed and opened on 4 October 2010.

The final part of Phase One, which is construction of houses to the north of the new town, was next to begin. The housing development of Phoenix Park will eventually hold 850 new homes, some of which had been completed by 2012.

Also, another important step towards full completion of the project has been met, with funding being approved for the second phase. Phase two of the construction, which includes shopping facilities, was planned to start around mid-2012.

A new dual carriageway that would link the new town with the M8 and M74 motorways has been given approval, with an extra £10 million to bring the project forward agreed in June 2012. The new carriageway would also travel through neighbouring North Lanarkshire settlements, Motherwell and Carfin.

In September 2012, the first building of a new BRE Innovation Park was opened, with the visitor centre building officially completed. A total of ten energy-efficient buildings were expected to be built in the park.

On 14 November 2012, plans were also un-veiled to build a new Marston's pub-restaurant directly to the north-east of the Sports Facility. Despite favourable first impressions, the proposal did not receive planning permission at the time.

Progress slowed on the development due to adverse economic factors, and a revised masterplan was submitted in 2018, being approved the following year. The planning report, which differed from the earlier master vision with the amount of retail space reduced by around 60% and no short term prospect for a new railway station, anticipated that progress would be slow but steady across the site, not being completed until around 2045.

Transport

As part of the regeneration, the transport links to Ravenscraig will be greatly improved. There will be a new transport interchange within walking distance of the new town centre offering bus services to Glasgow and Lanark. There will be easy access to public transport throughout the site including dedicated business routes. There will also be a new railway station built that will link to the broader public transport network. The Argyle Line travels through the area, so trains could easily travel to major Scottish railway stations such as Glasgow Central from Ravenscraig.

In future, the Greenlink Cycle Path may be extended to connect Ravenscraig with a direct route to Strathclyde Country Park.

Motherwell FC
The local professional football team, Motherwell Football Club is one of the possible purchasers of the site for a new stadium, leaving behind their home of 113 years, Fir Park. In 2008, Mark McGhee, then-manager of the club, had said that he and the directors held tentative discussions with North Lanarkshire Council about building the new stadium on the site. Despite indications that the move may be in procress of becoming a reality, a move to Ravenscraig in the short-term would be impossible.

Location Grid

See also
 List of places in North Lanarkshire

References

External links

Official development website
 Steeling Back Memories (Ravenscraig) at Culture NL

Motherwell
New towns in Scotland
Neighbourhoods in North Lanarkshire